Residual chemical shift anisotropy (RCSA) is the difference between the chemical shift anisotropy (CSA) of aligned and non-aligned molecules. It is normally three orders of magnitude smaller than the static CSA, with values on the order of parts-per-billion (ppb). RCSA is useful for structural determination and it is among the new developments in NMR spectroscopy.

See also
Residual dipolar coupling

References

Further reading

Nuclear magnetic resonance spectroscopy
Nuclear chemistry
Nuclear physics